Alphamosaic Ltd was a fabless semiconductor company specialising in low power mobile multimedia processors, based on their VideoCore architecture.

Alphamosaic was founded in Cambridge, UK by Robert Swann and Steve Barlow in October 2000, as a spin out from Cambridge Consultants supported by venture capital from Prelude Trust, ACT and TTP Ventures.

Developed at a time when video and multimedia processing was challenging on mobile devices, the technology centered round a novel 2D digital signal processor (DSP) architecture called VideoCore for low-power processing of video and images. It was used in consumer devices including phones from Samsung and the first Apple video iPod to handle video record and playback, image capture and processing, audio capture and processing, graphics, games and ringtones.  

In September 2004, Alphamosaic was acquired by Broadcom for $123 million, forming its Mobile Multimedia group on the Cambridge Science Park site.

Initial products VC01 and VC02 were multimedia coprocessors, later products were application processors. For a list of products, see VideoCore.

See also 
 VideoCore

References

Broadcom
Companies based in Cambridge
2004 mergers and acquisitions
Defunct computer companies of the United Kingdom
Defunct manufacturing companies of the United Kingdom